Sechelt Inlet formerly Seechelt Inlet is one of the principal inlets of the British Columbia Coast. The inlet is significant in that it almost makes an island of what is instead the Sechelt Peninsula, whose isthmus is at the town of Sechelt at the head of the inlet. Sechelt Inlet's mouth is at Jervis Inlet, inland from the Malaspina Strait.

Also significant about Sechelt Inlet are, near the inlet's mouth, the Sechelt Rapids within the Skookumchuck Narrows, which rage with near waterfall-like fury during tidal flow, both incoming and outgoing. Other fjords on the British Columbia Coast have similar rapids, also called skookumchucks (strong waters in the Chinook Jargon, the old coastal trade language), which like Sechelt Inlet are caused by the typical shallows and narrows near the mouth of a fjord as the volume of water inside the fjord's depths tries to pour out to, or in from, the more open waters beyond. In Sechelt Inlet's case, the Skookumchuck Narrows are exactly as its name describes - narrow - forcing the water to an even greater torrent than is typical elsewhere.

 
From early April to late September 2007, the inlet was a habitat for over 200 Pacific white-sided dolphin. These social mammals seemed to enjoy seeking the attention of their human observers.

See also

List of fjords in Canada
Mount Richardson Provincial Park
Porpoise Bay Provincial Park
Lighthouse Pub

References

Fjords of British Columbia
Sunshine Coast (British Columbia)
Sunshine Coast Regional District
Inlets of British Columbia
Sechelt